was a town located in Kamiiso District, Oshima Subprefecture, Hokkaido, Japan.

As of 2004, the town had an estimated population of 36,887 and a density of 140.57 persons per km2. The total area was 262.41 km2.

On February 1, 2006, Kamiiso was merged with the town of Ōno (from Kameda District) to form the new city of Hokuto.

External links
Hokuto official website 

Dissolved municipalities of Hokkaido